The Etobicoke Kangaroos is an amateur Australian Football club based in Toronto, Ontario, Canada.  They are members of the AFL Ontario.

The club made a surprise Grand Final appearance in 2003 (their first year of competition) and lost to the Toronto Dingos. The Kangaroos lost to the Toronto Eagles in the 2007 and 2009 Grand Final. In 2008, the Kangaroos defeated Toronto to post their first OAFL premiership. The Kangaroos won back-to-back Premierships in 2011 (vs High Park) and in 2012 (vs Broadview Hawks). The Kangaroos won two premierships in season 2015, adding their fourth division 1 premiership by defeating the Toronto Eagles and their first Women's premiership after the Lady Roos defeated the Hamilton Wildcats. In 2016, the men's team suffered two defeats in a row in the finals, crashing out of a Preliminary Final against the Toronto Rebels. The Lady Roos went won the 2016, 2017, and 2018 premierships.

External links
 

Ontario Australian Football League clubs
Australian rules football clubs in Toronto
Australian rules football clubs in Canada
Etobicoke
2003 establishments in Ontario
Australian rules football clubs established in 2003